The Morte is a river of Eure-et-Loir, a branch of the Voise. To the point where it rejoins the Voise, the Morte runs 9.8 km through 6 communes, from upstream to downstream Ymeray, Gallardon, Bailleau-Armenonville, Yermenonville, Gas and Houx.

References

Rivers of Centre-Val de Loire
Rivers of Eure-et-Loir
Rivers of France